Governor Stephens may refer to:

Alexander H. Stephens (1812–1883), 50th governor of Georgia
Lawrence Vest Stephens (1858–1923), 29th governor of Missouri
Samuel Stephens (North Carolina governor) (1629–1669), Governor of the Albemarle Colony (later North Carolina) from 1667 to 1669
Stan Stephens (1929–2021), 20th governor of Montana
William Stephens (American politician) (1859–1944), 24th Governor of California
William Stephens (governor of Georgia) (1671–1753), Colonial Governor of Georgia from 1743 to 1751

See also
Governor Stephen (disambiguation)